Piracy is an EC Comics title published in the mid 1950s. The bi-monthly comic book, published by Bill Gaines and edited by Al Feldstein, began with an issue cover-dated October–November 1954. It ran for seven issues, ending with the October–November 1955 issue.

Front covers were by Wally Wood, Reed Crandall, Bernard Krigstein and George Evans. The stories of adventure on the high seas were illustrated by Wood, Crandall, Krigstein, Jack Davis, Al Williamson, Graham Ingels and Angelo Torres.

Piracy was reprinted (in black and white) as part of publisher Russ Cochran's The Complete EC Library.  Between March and September 1998, Cochran (in association with Gemstone Publishing) reprinted all seven individual issues.  This complete run was later rebound, with covers included, in a pair of softcover EC Annuals.

Issue guide

See also
List of Entertaining Comics publications

External links
Comics book DB page

EC Comics publications
Comics by Carl Wessler